The Vogelberg (also known as Passwang; 1,204.1 m) is a mountain of the Jura, located north of Mümliswil in the Swiss canton of Solothurn. It lies east of the Passwang Pass. The border with the canton of Basel-Landschaft runs north of the mountain. The Vogelberg is the easternmost summit above 1,200 metres in the Jura Mountains.

References

External links
Vogelberg on Hikr

Mountains of Switzerland
Mountains of the canton of Bern
Mountains of the Jura
Mountains of the canton of Solothurn
One-thousanders of Switzerland